Mick Clarke (born 19 June 1989 in Drogheda, Ireland) is an Irish footballer who is currently unattached. Clarke is a defender and plays as a right-back.

Career
Mick Clarke is a tough defender. He used to play for Irish team Kentstown before moving on to Drogheda United's U17 Team. Clarke made his Drogheda United senior debut in May 2007 in a 3-0 League of Ireland Cup defeat to Shamrock Rovers. In May 2008, he signed a professional contract with Drogheda United. Clarke made a number of first team starts towards the end of the 2008 season. In 2009, Clarke started Drogheda's first league game of 2009 season against Derry City but following this he struggled to hold down a place in their first team. Clarke departed Drogheda United at the end of the 2009 season and he joined Shelbourne on 21 February 2010. He made his Shelbourne debut in a League of Ireland Cup tie against Monaghan United on 23 March 2010. Clarke briefly held down Shels' right back spot during the midpoint of their 2010 season before parting ways with the club on 17 August 2010. During his spell at Shelbourne he made a total 11 league and cup appearances for Shelbourne and he won a Leinster Senior Cup winners medal as an unused substitute in the final against Bray Wanderers on 2 August 2010.

Career statistics

Correct as of July 30, 2010.

Honours
Leinster Senior Cup: 1
 Shelbourne - 2010

References

External links
 Mick Clarke's profile at www.shelbournefc.com

1989 births
Living people
People from Drogheda
Association footballers from County Louth
Republic of Ireland association footballers
League of Ireland players
Drogheda United F.C. players
Shelbourne F.C. players
Association football defenders